Pashtun Americans are Americans who are of ethnic Pashtun origin, hailing from Afghanistan and Pakistan.

Demographics

In the United States, the Pashtuns are a sub-community within the wider Pakistani American and Afghan American communities. Areas with large populations include New York City, where there are over 12,000 Pashtuns, as well as the San Francisco Bay Area, Virginia, Los Angeles, Georgia (U.S. state), Chicago Metropolitan Area, the Dallas-Fort Worth metroplex, and Oregon. Fremont, California has the largest Afghan community in the United States. According to the 2010 Census, 15,788 individuals identified Pashto as their first language spoken at home.

Military
A small number of Pashtun Americans have served in the United States Armed Forces, in varying roles in the War in Afghanistan. Lieutenant Colonel Asad A. Khan, a Pakistani-American marine, was a member of one of the first conventional units to enter Afghanistan. Khan would return to Afghanistan in command of the 1st Battalion 6th Marines in 2004; only to be later relieved of command. Pfc. Usman Khattak, an ethnic Pashtun from northwest Pakistan, is a US Army Food Specialist with the 539th Transportation Division and is based at the US Army camp in Kuwait.

Media
The Voice of America has a Pashto language service.

Organizations
The Pakhtoon American Community Association (PACA) is a cultural association based in Maryland, which organizes an annual Pashto Conference, in addition to other events. The Khyber Society, founded in 1986 in New York, also arranges cultural events.

See also

 Pakistani Americans
 Afghan Americans
 Pashtun diaspora

References

 
Asian-American society
South Asian American
Afghan American
Pakistani American
American
Central Asian American